Carnepigondolella is an extinct genus of conodonts of the Late Triassic of Italy or Canada.

References

External links 

Ozarkodinida genera
Late Triassic fish
Triassic conodonts
Fossils of Canada
Fossils of Italy